Alright, All Right or Allwright may refer to:

Music

Albums
 Alright! (album), a 2007 album by Bogdan Raczynski
 Alright, a 2011 album by Jerry Williams
 All Right, a 1982 album by Himiko Kikuchi

Songs
 "Alright" (Cast song)
 "Alright" (Darius Rucker song)
 "Alright" (Jain song)
 "Alright" (Jamiroquai song)
 "Alright" (Janet Jackson song)
 "Alright" (Kendrick Lamar song)
 "Alright" (Kris Kross song)
 "Alright!!" (Superfly song)
 "Alright" (Supergrass song)
 "All Right", by Christopher Cross
 "All Right" (Faron Young song)
 "Alright!", by Ami Suzuki from Connetta
 "Alright", by Baboon from Something Good Is Going to Happen to You
 "Alright", by Electric Light Orchestra from Zoom
 "Alright", by Emily King from East Side Story
 "Alright", by Guided by Voices from Alien Lanes
 "Alright", by Inna from Party Never Ends
 "Alright", by Ledisi from Lost & Found
 "Alright", by Logic featuring Big Sean from Under Pressure
 "Alright", by the Lucy Nation from the Austin Powers: The Spy Who Shagged Me soundtrack
 "Alright", by Mark Knight featuring Sway
 "Alright, Alright, Alright", by Mungo Jerry
 "Alright", by Pearl Jam from Gigaton
 "Alright", by Pilot Speed from Caught by the Window
 "Alright", by Screaming Jets from Tear of Thought
 "Alright", by Shiloh from Picture Imperfect
 "Alright", by Skindred from Roots Rock Riot
 "Alright", by Status Quo from In Search of the Fourth Chord
 "Alright", by the Subways from All or Nothing
 "Alright", by Tadpole from The Buddhafinger
 "Alright", by Twista from Category F5
 "I-ight (Alright)", by Doug E. Fresh
 "All Right", by Future from Purple Reign
 "All Right", by the Guess Who from It's Time
 "All Right", by Ringo Starr from Ringo's Rotogravure

People
 Graeme Allwright (born 1926), New Zealand-born France-based singer-songwriter
 Joel Allwright (born 1988), Australian footballer
 Matt Allwright, English television presenter

Other uses
 Allright (automobile) (German: Allreit), a German automobile
 Allright, Illinois, an unincorporated community in the US
 "All Right", a 2019 poem by UK Poet Laureate Simon Armitage for a suicide prevention campaign

See also 
 Smith v. Allwright, a 1944 US Supreme Court case about voting rights
 "All Right Now", a song by Free
 Alright, Still, a 2006 album by Lily Allen
 Alright Already (disambiguation)
 Albright (disambiguation)